John F. Tomlinson (26 June 1934 – 4 February 2014) was an English professional footballer who played as a winger.

Career
Born in Birkenhead, Tomlinson played for Everton, Chesterfield and Corby Town.

References

1934 births
2014 deaths
English footballers
Everton F.C. players
Chesterfield F.C. players
Corby Town F.C. players
English Football League players
Association football wingers
Sportspeople from Birkenhead